Xingbin District is the only district of the city of Laibin, Guangxi, China.

Transportation 
Laibin railway station on the Hunan–Guangxi railway and Laibin North railway station on the Liuzhou–Nanning intercity railway are both situated here.

County-level divisions of Guangxi
Laibin